The 2000 Toronto Argonauts finished in 4th place in the East Division of the 2000 CFL season with a 7–10–1 record and failed to qualify for the playoffs.

Offseason

CFL draft

Preseason

 † The CFL had scheduled a demonstration of the league's new overtime format following the game regardless of whether the score necessitated it.

Regular season

Season standings

Schedule

Postseason
Despite a late season run (6–4–0) under interim coach Michael "Pinball" Clemons, the Argonauts failed to qualify for the playoffs.

Awards and records

2000 CFL All-Stars
SB – Derrell Mitchell
P – Noel Prefontaine

Eastern Division All-Star Selections
SB – Derrell Mitchell
DT – Johnny Scott
LB – Mike O'Shea
LB – Calvin Tiggle
P – Noel Prefontaine

References

Toronto Argonauts seasons
Toronto Argonauts Season, 2000